The 2019 Liga THB-KFA  is the first season of the Liga THB-KFA, which is a Malaysian football competition featuring semi-professional and amateur clubs from Kedah.

Teams
A total of 20 teams competed in the league. The Liga THB-KFA was played from July to September, in single round-robin format.

Result

League table

North Zone
</noinclude>South Zone<noinclude>

Final

References

External links
Official Website

4
Malay